Patricia Stokkers (born May 1, 1976 in Utrecht) is a former freestyle swimmer from the Netherlands, who competed for her native country at the 1996 Summer Olympics in Atlanta, Georgia. There she finished in sixth position (8:08.48) with the 4×200 m freestyle relay, alongside Carla Geurts, Minouche Smit, and Kirsten Vlieghuis. A year earlier the four of them won the silver medal in the same event at the European LC Championships in Vienna, Austria.

References
Dutch Olympic Committee

1976 births
Living people
Dutch female freestyle swimmers
Olympic swimmers of the Netherlands
Swimmers at the 1996 Summer Olympics
Sportspeople from Utrecht (city)
European Aquatics Championships medalists in swimming
20th-century Dutch women